Miracle in Cell No. 7 is a 2013 South Korean film.

Miracle in Cell No. 7 may refer to the following remakes:

 Miracle in Cell No. 7 (2019 Philippine film)
 Miracle in Cell No. 7 (2019 Turkish film)
 Miracle in Cell No. 7, a 2022 Indonesian film directed by Hanung Bramantyo